Yahoo! is a computer software and web search engine company founded on March 1, 1995. The company is a public corporation and its headquarters is located in Sunnyvale, California. It was founded by Stanford University graduate students Jerry Yang and David Filo in 1994. According to web traffic analysis companies, Yahoo has been one of the most visited websites on the Internet, with more than 130 million unique users per month in the United States alone. As of October 2007, the global network of Yahoo receives 3.4 billion page views per day on average, making it one of the most visited US websites.

Yahoo's first acquisition was the purchase of Net Controls, a web search engine company, in September 1997 for US$1.4 million. As of April 2008, the company's largest acquisition is the purchase of Broadcast.com, an Internet radio company, for $5.7 billion, making Broadcast.com co-founder Mark Cuban a billionaire. Most of the companies acquired by Yahoo are based in the United States; 78 of the companies are from the United States, and 15 are based in a foreign country. As of July 2015, Yahoo has acquired 114 companies, with Polyvore being the latest.



Acquisitions

See also 
 List of largest mergers and acquisitions
 Lists of corporate acquisitions and mergers

References 

Yahoo